The San Diego Toreros women's basketball team is a college basketball team that represents the University of San Diego in San Diego, California. The school's team currently competes in the West Coast Conference.

History
San Diego began play in 1980 and they joined the West Coast Conference in 1985. They have made three NCAA Tournament appearances (1993, 2000, 2008) and six WNIT appearances (2007, 2012, 2013, 2014, 2015, 2016), with a Final Four appearance in the 2012 WNIT. As of the end of the 2015–16 season, the Toreros have an all-time record of 516–523.

NCAA tournament results

References

External links